Beijing Origus Food & Beverage Ltd., doing business as Origus Pizza Buffet or Origus, is a Chinese Western-style buffet chain. It is headquartered in Chaoyang District, Beijing.

History
It was founded in 1998, by Mu Ji. Foreign investment was used to start the company.

In February 2007 the company had locations in Beijing, Shanghai, Shenzhen, Hangzhou, and Jinzhou. That month the company opened its first restaurant in Lanzhou.

By March 2007 prices at Origus per person were raised from 39 yuan to 39.99 yuan. Around that time some customers in Beijing reported getting only one fen (one hundredth of a yuan) in change.

As of 2014 it had over 100 restaurants; they were located in larger cities. That year, MUS Roosevelt Capital Partners invested an undisclosed amount into Origus.

Corporate affairs
It is headquartered in the Shang Office Building (金尚丽办公大楼) in Chaoyang District, Beijing.

It was previously in a building on Beiyuan Road, and on another occasion in Wangjiao Plaza in Wangjing Subdistrict of Chaoyang District.

References

Further reading
O'Malley, Tom. "Bad For You: Origus Pizza Buffet" (Archive). The Beijinger. July 12, 2010.

External links
  Origus
 Origus - Pine Field Capital

Fast-food chains of China
Restaurants in Beijing
Chinese companies established in 1998
Restaurants established in 1998
Pizza chains